Project Excelsior was a series of parachute jumps made by Joseph Kittinger of the United States Air Force in 1959 and 1960 from helium balloons in the stratosphere. The purpose was to test the Beaupre multi-stage parachute system intended to be used by pilots ejecting from high altitude. In one of these jumps Kittinger set world records for the longest parachute drogue fall, the highest parachute jump, and the fastest speed by a human through the atmosphere. He held the latter two of these records for 52 years, until they were broken by Felix Baumgartner of the Red Bull Stratos project in 2012, though he still holds the world record for longest time in free fall.

Background
As jet planes flew higher and faster in the 1950s, the Air Force became increasingly worried about the safety of flight crews who had to eject at high altitude. Tests in Operation High Dive with dummies had shown that a body in free-fall at high altitude would often go into a flat spin at a rate of up to 200 revolutions per minute (about 3.3 revolutions per second). This would be potentially fatal.

Project Excelsior was initiated in 1958 to design a parachute system that would allow a safe, controlled descent after a high-altitude ejection. Francis Beaupre, a technician at Wright-Patterson AFB, Ohio, devised a multi-stage parachute system to facilitate human tests. This consisted of a small  diameter stabilizer or "drogue" parachute, designed to prevent uncontrolled spinning at high altitudes, and a  diameter main parachute that deployed at a lower altitude. The system included timers and altitude sensors that would automatically deploy both parachutes at the correct points in the descent, even if the parachutist were unconscious or disabled.

Captain Joseph Kittinger, who was test director for the project, made three ascents and test jumps. As the gondola was unpressurized, Kittinger wore a modified David Clark MC-3A partial pressure suit during these tests, plus additional layers of clothing to protect him from the extreme cold at high altitude. Together with the parachute system, this almost doubled his weight. He did not enjoy the jumping and was nearly killed.

Test jumps
The first test, Excelsior I, was made on November 16, 1959. In this first test, the stabilizer parachute was deployed too soon, catching Kittinger around the neck and causing him to spin at 120 revolutions per minute.

Despite this near-disaster on the first test, Kittinger went ahead with another test only three weeks later. The second test, Excelsior II, was made on December 11, 1959.

The third and final test, Excelsior III, was made on August 16, 1960. During the ascent, the pressure seal in Kittinger's right glove failed, and he began to experience severe pain in his right hand from the exposure of his hand to the extreme low pressure. (See Space exposure.) He decided not to inform the ground crew about this, in case they should decide to abort the test. Kittinger stayed at peak altitude for 12 minutes, waiting for the balloon to drift over the landing target area. He then stepped out of the gondola to begin his descent.

The small stabilizer parachute deployed successfully and Kittinger fell for 4 minutes and 36 seconds, setting a long-standing world record for the longest free-fall. The whole descent took 13 minutes and 45 seconds and set a world record for the highest parachute jump.

A plaque attached below the open door of the Excelsior III gondola read, "This is the highest step in the world".

Kittinger does, however, still hold the records for longest drogue fall and longest freefall.

Response

Kittinger's efforts during Project Excelsior proved that it was possible for an air crew to descend safely after ejecting at high altitudes. President Dwight D. Eisenhower awarded Kittinger the C. B. Harmon Trophy for his work on Excelsior. Kittinger also received an oak leaf cluster to the Distinguished Flying Cross, the J.J. Jeffries Award, the A. Leo Stevens Parachute Medal, and the Wingfoot Lighter-Than-Air Society Achievement Award.

See also
 Le Grand Saut
 Red Bull Stratos, a 2012 mission advised by Kittinger, with Austrian skydiver Felix Baumgartner setting a new record
 Space diving

Notes

References 

 Burkhard Bilger, Our Far-Flung Correspondents, "Falling," The New Yorker, August 13, 2007, p. 58

Further reading
 (Joseph W. Kittinger's autobiography)

External links
 On Stratocat website
National Museum of the U.S. Air Force Excelsior page
U.S. Air Force Footage of Excelsior Tests
Details of the Excelsior I flight
Details of the Excelsior II flight
Details of the Excelsior III flight -The Big Jump-
Interview with Joseph Kittinger
The Highest Step - video
Col. Joe Kittinger speaks at the Kircher Society Meeting - Video Pt1 - featuring an extended Project Excelsior Video
Col. Joe Kittinger speaks at the Kircher Society Meeting - Video Pt2
Col. Joe Kittinger speaks at the Kircher Society Meeting - Video Pt3
Excelsior III - the Long, Lonely Leap painting by Stuart Brown
 

Ballooning
Military projects of the United States
Military parachuting
Space diving
Space research
Human subject research in the United States